The Twin Ports League was an American minor baseball league that existed for six weeks (May 30 through July 13) during the wartime  season. Comprising four teams based in Duluth, Minnesota, and Superior, Wisconsin.

History
The Twin Ports League was the only league to be designated Class E—one level below the previously lowest minor league level, Class D—by the National Association of Professional Baseball Leagues (the formal name of Minor League Baseball).

According to Baseball Americas Encyclopedia of Minor League Baseball, many of the players in the Twin Ports League were employed in the Twin Ports' war factories, dockyards and shipyards. The teams included the Duluth Dukes, Duluth Heralds, Duluth Marine Iron, and the Superior Bays. The Superior club was in first place when the league disbanded on July 13, 1943.

Only one player in the Twin Ports League eventually reached Major League Baseball—Ernie Rudolph, who pitched in seven games for the 1945 Brooklyn Dodgers.

Former major league player Wally Gilbert managed the Marine Iron team.

Cities represented  
Duluth, MN: Duluth Dukes 1943; Duluth Heralds 1943; Duluth Marine Iron 1943 
Superior, WI: Superior Bays 1943

Standings and statistics

1943 Twin Ports League
The league disbanded July 13.

References
 Johnson, Lloyd, and Wolff, Miles, eds., The Encyclopedia of Minor League Baseball, 2nd edition. Durham, North Carolina: Baseball America, 1997, page 339

External links
 1943 Twin Ports League page at Baseball Reference

1943 establishments in the United States
1943 disestablishments in the United States
Baseball leagues in Minnesota
Baseball leagues in Wisconsin
Defunct minor baseball leagues in the United States
Sports leagues established in 1943
1943 in baseball